The Puppy Classic is a greyhound racing competition held annually at Nottingham Greyhound Stadium.

It was inaugurated in 1995. The competition is only open to puppies, aged under two years of age. In 2022, new sponsors JenningsBet increased the winner's prize to £10,000.

Past winners

Venues & Distances
1995–present (Nottingham 500m)

Sponsors
1998-1998 (Coldseal)
2001-2005 (William Hill)
2006-2007 (Carling Brewery)
2008-2015 (Caffrey's Irish Ale)
2017–2018 (Greyhound Media Group)
2019–2019 (Stadium Bookmakers)
2021–2021 (ARC)
2022–present (JenningsBet)

References

Greyhound racing competitions in the United Kingdom
Sport in Nottingham
Recurring sporting events established in 1995